Valea Ierii is a commune in Cluj County, Transylvania, Romania. It is composed of three villages: Cerc (Kisfeneshavas), Plopi (Plop) and Valea Ierii.

Demographics 
According to the census from 2011 there was a total population of 888 people living in this commune. Of this population, nearly all are ethnic Romanians.

References

Atlasul localităților județului Cluj (Cluj County Localities Atlas), Suncart Publishing House, Cluj-Napoca, 

Communes in Cluj County
Localities in Transylvania